Louis, Hereditary Prince of Lorraine (28 January 170410 May 1711) was heir apparent to the throne of the sovereign Duchy of Lorraine.

His father was the reigning Duke of Lorraine and his mother a member of the House of Bourbon, then ruling the Kingdom of France. He became the Hereditary Prince at his birth in 1704, but died of smallpox in 1711 at the age of seven, unmarried and without descendants.

Biography

He was born at the Château de Lunéville to Léopold, Duke of Lorraine and his wife Élisabeth Charlotte d'Orléans.

Louis was the fifth child but second son born to his parents. Also, Louis was the second of the four heirs of his father: his older brother Prince Léopold, Duke of Bar (26 August 16992 April 1700) died aged eight months; his younger brother Léopold Clément Charles (25 April 17074 June 1723) died aged sixteen and his younger brother François Etienne/Stephen lived to adulthood, became the Duke of Lorraine and also, by union, became Holy Roman Emperor and founded the House of Habsburg-Lorraine.

Soon after his birth, on 24 June 1704, the young prince was baptised as a Roman Catholic at the Château de Lunéville. He did not see the deaths of two of his siblings: Louis, Duke of Bar (26 August 16992 April 1700) and Princess Louise Christine (13 November 170118 November 1701) both died before reaching the age of one. By the time of his birth, however, two sisters had survived.

An epidemic of smallpox was going around Europe in the Spring of 1711. It had already killed people like the Holy Roman Emperor Joseph I (who died on 17 April) and the Grand Dauphin, Louis (who died on 14 April). Unfortunately, against all efforts, Princess Élisabeth Charlotte of Lorraine, Louis' older sister, contracted smallpox and died on 4 May. Before this, she passed the disease on to Louis and Princess Marie Gabrièle Charlotte. Louis died on 10 May and Marie Gabrièle Charlotte died the very next day. They were both buried in the ducal crypt at the Église Saint-François-des-Cordeliers. At Louis' death, his younger brother Léopold Clement Charles became Hereditary Prince, but he, too died of smallpox in 1723, at the age of sixteen.

Ancestry

References and notes

|-

House of Lorraine
1704 births
1711 deaths
Heirs apparent who never acceded
Deaths from smallpox
18th-century French people
People from Lunéville
Hereditary Princes of Lorraine
Royalty and nobility who died as children